School for Wives is a 1925 American silent drama film directed by Victor Halperin and starring Conway Tearle, Sigrid Holmquist, and Peggy Kelly. It provided an early role for the future star Brian Donlevy. Based on Leonard Merrick's 1907 melodramatic novel The House of Lynch, it was not well-received by critics.

Plot
As described in a film magazine review, a rich young woman marries a poor English artist who refuses to accept her father's tainted money. The artist lives up to his ideals, which precipitates a conflict. He is forced to accept a sum which permits their son to have an operation. After the wife gives up on her father's money through learning that it has no place in the scheme of happiness, she is reconciled to her husband. They live happily.

Cast

Preservation
With no prints of School for Wives located in any film archives, it is a lost film.

References

Bibliography
 Goble, Alan. The Complete Index to Literary Sources in Film. Walter de Gruyter, 1999.
 Sculthorpe, Derek. Brian Donlevy, the Good Bad Guy: A Bio-Filmography. McFarland, 2017.

External links

1925 films
1925 drama films
Silent American drama films
American silent feature films
1920s English-language films
Films directed by Victor Halperin
American black-and-white films
Films based on British novels
Vitagraph Studios films
1925 lost films
Lost drama films
1920s American films